The Battle of Sejny took place in September 1920 during the Polish–Soviet War and Polish–Lithuanian War. Polish Army forces commanded by Edward Śmigły-Rydz and Stefan Dąb-Biernacki, clashed with Lithuanian units near the towns of Sejny and Suwałki (current northeastern Poland).

In July 1920, the Lithuanians took advantage of desperate position of Poland, which at that time was invaded by Soviet Russia. They captured Suwałki, Sejny and Augustów, and their troops moved southwards, reaching the line of the Augustów Canal. In late August, after the victorious Battle of Warsaw, Operational Group of the Polish Army came to the area of Suwałki.

Following orders of Edward Rydz-Śmigły, Polish forces took Augustów from Lithuanians in a surprise attack on 28 August. Confused and disoriented, Lithuanians retreated from Suwałki and Sejny on 30 and 31 August. The Lithuanians reorganized, gathered their forces (11 battalions with 7,000 soldiers), and organized a counterattack to "defend their border" on 2 September. The goal was to take and secure the Augustów–Lipsk–Hrodna line. The Lithuanians succeeded in taking Sejny and Lipsk and by 4 September reached the outskirts of Augustów. On 5 September the Poles counterattacked and forced the Lithuanians to retreat. On 9 September the Polish forces recaptured Sejny, but the Lithuanians pushed back and regained Sejny and Giby on 13 and 14 September. Pending direct negotiations, hostilities were ceased on both sides.

On 8 September, during a planning meeting of the Battle of the Niemen River, the Poles decided to maneuver through the Lithuanian-held territory to the rear of the Soviet Army, stationed in Hrodna. Polish Northern Assault Group (Polnocna Grupa Uderzeniowa), consisting of infantry and cavalry divisions, was ready to enter action on 19 September, with the railroad hub of Lida set as its objective.

On 22 September the Polish units began their attack. The 4th Cavalry Brigade, after scattering Lithuanian infantry, captured bridges over the Neman at Druskininkai. The 1st Legions Infantry Division of Colonel Dab-Biernacki attacked Lithuanian 2nd Infantry Division at Sejny, capturing the town after a six-hour battle. Lithuanian losses were estimated at 1,700, most of them were prisoners of war. Following the capture of Sejny, the Poles marched towards Druskininkai and Lida. Several clashes with the enemy resulted in the destruction of Lithuanian 7th Infantry Regiment. Polish forces then marched, as planned on 8 September across the Neman River near Druskininkai and Merkinė to the rear of the Soviet forces near Hrodna and Lida.

The Battle of Sejny is commemorated on the Tomb of the Unknown Soldier, Warsaw, with the inscription "SEJNY 1 – 10, 22 IX 1920".

Sources 

 Leksykon wojny polsko-rosyjskiej 1919–1920. Warszawa: Oficyna Wydawnicza RYTM

Sejny
1920 in Poland
1920 in Lithuania
Sejny
Sejny
September 1920 events